Portlandville is a hamlet (and census-designated place) in Otsego County, New York, United States. Portlandville has a post office with ZIP code 13834, which opened on April 9, 1828.

References

Hamlets in Otsego County, New York
Hamlets in New York (state)